O Hui-sun (born 22 November 1993) was a North Korean football midfielder who played for the North Korea women's national football team.

She participated at the 2012 Summer Olympics. At the club level, she played for Sobaeksu.

See also
 North Korea at the 2012 Summer Olympics

References

External links

 Profile at sports-reference.com

1993 births
Living people
North Korean women's footballers
Place of birth missing (living people)
Footballers at the 2012 Summer Olympics
Olympic footballers of North Korea
Women's association football midfielders
North Korea women's international footballers